This is a list of association football families. The countries are listed according to the national teams of the senior family member if the other family member played for a different country.  If the senior members of the given member did not play international football, the family will be listed according to nationality (e.g., the Trézéguets).

Families included on the list must have
 at least, one member of the family is capped by a national team on the senior level or an important person in the game of football (e.g., notable coaches, referees, club chairmen, etc.)
 a second member must be a professional player or capped by a national team on the senior level.

Afghanistan
 Qays Shayesteh, Faysal Shayesteh (brother)
 David Najem, Adam Najem (brother)

Antigua and Barbuda
 Dario Barthley, Dajun Barthley, Dajari Barthley (brothers)
 Sowerby Gomes, Amaya Gomes (daughter)
 Courtney Wildin, Luther Wildin (brother)

Argentina
 Rodrigo Acosta, Lautaro Acosta (brother)
 Sergio Agüero, Mauricio del Castillo, Gastón del Castillo (brothers)
 Pablo Aimar, Andrés Aimar (brother)
 Sergio Almirón Sr., Sergio Almirón Jr. (son)
 Julio Asad, Omar Asad (nephew), Yamil Asad (Omar's son)
 Angelo Badini,  Emilio Badini, Cesare Badini, Augusto Badini (brothers)
 Guillermo Barros Schelotto, Gustavo Barros Schelotto (twin brother)
 José Batista, Sergio Batista, Norberto Batista, Fernando Batista (sons)
 Carlos Bianchi, Eduardo Domínguez (son-in-law)
 Maxi Biancucchi, Emanuel Biancucchi (brother), Lionel Messi (cousin),  Bojan (Lionel's fourth cousin),  Bojan Krkić (Bojan Jr.'s father)
 Cristian Biglia, Lucas Biglia (brother)
 , Eduardo Blanco (brother)
 Jonathan Bottinelli, Darío Bottinelli (brother)
 Jorge Brown, Carlos Brown, Ernesto Brown, Alfredo Brown, Eliseo Brown, Diego Brown, Tomás Brown (brothers), Juan Domingo Brown (cousin)
 José Luis Brown, Juan Ignacio Brown (son)
 Nicolás Burdisso, Guillermo Burdisso (brother)
 José Luis Calderón, Lucas Calderón (son)
 Nicolás Cambiasso, Esteban Cambiasso (brother)
 Pedro Canaveri, Zoilo Canavery (cousin)
 Jorge Davino,  Flavio Davino,  Duilio Davino (sons)
 Vicente de la Mata, Francisco de la Mata (brother)
 Attilio Demaría (see  Italy)
 Leandro Desábato, Leandro Luis Desábato, Andrés Desábato (cousins, twins)
 Alfredo Di Stéfano (see  Alfredo Di Stefano Sr.)
 Juan Carlos Díaz, Daniel Díaz (brother)
 Zenón Díaz,  (brother),  (son), Octavio Díaz (nephew/Juan's son)
 Héctor Enrique, Carlos Enrique, Fernando Enrique, Ramiro Enrique (sons)
 Marcelo Espina,  Santiago Espina (son)

 Juan Evaristo, Mario Evaristo (brother)
 Néstor Fabbri, Jonathan Calleri (nephew)
 Victorio Faggiani, Ernesto Faggiani (brother)
 Adolfo Ferraresi,  Nahuel Ferraresi (son)
 Enzo Ferrero,  (brother)
 Lautaro Formica, Mauro Formica (brother)
 Darío Franco, Emiliano Franco (son)
 Ramiro Funes Mori,  Rogelio Funes Mori (twin brother), Mauro Díaz (brother-in-law)
 Marcelo Gallardo, Nahuel Gallardo (son)
 Óscar Garré, Emiliano Garré, Ezequiel Garré (sons), Benjamín Garré (grandson, son of Emiliano)
 Daniel Gazzaniga, Paulo Gazzaniga, Gianfranco Gazzaniga (sons)
 Emmanuel Gigliotti, Sebastián Gigliotti (brother)
 Mariano González, Pablo González (brother)
 Carlos Griguol, Víctor Marchesini (son-in-law)
 Julio Grondona, Héctor Grondona (brother), Julio Ricardo Grondona, Humberto Grondona (sons), Gustavo Grondona (nephew),  Jaime Grondona (distant relative)
 Harry Hayes, Ennis Hayes (brother)
 Jorge Higuaín, Federico Higuaín, Gonzalo Higuaín (sons)
 Claudio Husaín, Darío Husaín (brother)
 Emiliano Insúa, Emanuel Insúa (brother)
 Luis Islas, Daniel Islas (brother),  (brother, twin of Daniel)
 Diego Klimowicz,  Javier Klimowicz, Nicolás Klimowicz (brothers),  Mateo Klimowicz (son), Luka Klimowicz (nephew/son of Javier)
 Ángel Labruna, Omar Labruna (son)
 Tomás Lanzini, Manuel Lanzini (brother)
 Giovani Lo Celso, Francesco Lo Celso (brother)
 Juan Carlos Loustau, Patricio Loustau (son)
 , Daniel Ludueña, Gonzalo Ludueña (sons)
 Javier Lux, Germán Lux (brother)
 Patricio Mac Allister, Carlos Mac Allister (brother), Francis Mac Allister, Kevin Mac Allister, Alexis Mac Allister (nephews, sons of Carlos)
 Alejandro Mancuso, Gianluca Mancuso (son)
 Diego Maradona, Raúl Maradona, Hugo Maradona (brothers),  Diego Sinagra (son), Sergio Agüero (son-in-law), Sergio Daniel López (nephew),  Diego Hernán Maradona, Jorge Raúl Maradona (nephews, sons of Raúl), Hernán López (great-nephew, son of Sergio Daniel)
 Gerardo Martino, Martín Luciano (nephew)
 Oscar Mas, Leonardo Mas (son)
 Cristian Menin,  Yésica Menin (sister),  Danilo Rinaldi,  Federico Rinaldi (cousins)
 Diego Milito, Gabriel Milito (brother)
 Antonio Mohamed, Shayr Mohamed (son)
 Ermindo Onega, Daniel Onega (brother)
 Cesar Paiber,  Brandon Paiber (son)
 Rodrigo Palacio (see  José Ramón Palacio)
 Martín Palermo, Ryduan Palermo (son)
 Leandro Paredes, Franco Paredes (cousin)
 Gonzalo Pavone, Mariano Pavone (brother)
 Pablo Paz, Nico Paz (son)
 Mauricio Pochettino,  Maurizio Pochettino (son)
 Sebastián Rambert (see  Ángel Rambert)
 Juan Román Riquelme, Sebastián Riquelme (brother)
 Leonardo Rodríguez,  Thomas Rodríguez (son)
 Maxi Rodríguez, Alexis Rodríguez, Denis Rodríguez (cousins/Denis & Alexis are twins)
 Atilio Romagnoli, Leandro Romagnoli (son)
 Alejandro Roncaglia, Facundo Roncaglia (brother)
 Oscar Ruggeri, Stephan Ruggeri (son)
 Miguel Ángel Russo, Ignacio Russo (son)
 ,  (brother)
 , Lionel Scaloni (brother)
 Héctor Scotta,  Valentino Fattore (grandson)
 , Rolando Schiavi (brother)
 José Serrizuela,  (brother)
 Diego Simeone, Giovanni Simeone, Gianluca Simeone, Giuliano Simeone (sons)
 Jorge Solari, Eduardo Solari (brother), Santiago Solari, Esteban Solari,  David Solari (nephews, sons of Eduardo), Augusto Solari (grandson, cousin-nephew of Santiago and his bros), Fernando Redondo Solari, Federico Redondo (cousin-nephews of Santiago and his bros), Fernando Redondo (father of Fernando Jr. and Federico)
 Diego Soñora,  Joel Soñora,  Alan Soñora (sons)
 Gabino Sosa, Blas Sosa (brother)
 Matías Suárez, Gastón Álvarez Suárez (nephew), Federico Álvarez (nephew/cousin of Gastón)
 Alexander Szymanowski, Marianela Szymanowski (sister)
 George Tarantini, Alberto Tarantini (brother)
 Jorge Trezeguet,  David Trezeguet (son)
 Marcelo Trobbiani, Pablo Trobbiani (son)
 Juan Vairo, Federico Vairo (brother)
 Juan Ramón Verón, Juan Sebastián Verón (son), Pedro Verde (brother-in-law)
 Enrique Vidallé, Jonathan Vidallé (son)
 Arnold Watson Hutton (see  Alexander Watson Hutton)
 Sergio Zanetti, Javier Zanetti (brother)
 Sergio Zárate, Ariel Zárate, Rolando Zárate, Mauro Zárate (brothers), Tobías Zárate (nephew, son of Rolando)
 Franco Zuculini, Bruno Zuculini (brother)

Aruba
 Leroy Oehlers, Dwight Oehlers (brother)

Australia
 Marin Alagich, Joe Alagich (son), Colin Alagich (nephew), Richie Alagich (son of Colin), Dianne Alagich (daughter of Colin/Richie's sister), Ethan Alagich (great-nephew/Richie's son)
 Ross Aloisi, John Aloisi (brother)
 John Anastasiadis, Dean Anastasiadis (brother)
 Graham Arnold, Trent Sainsbury (son-in-law)
 Kearyn Baccus, Keanu Baccus
 Paul Bilokapic, Nicholas Bilokapic (nephew)
 Martin Boyle (see  Rachael Boyle)
 Vic Bozanic, Oliver Bozanic (son),
 Mark Bresciano, Robert Bresciano (brother)
 Ashley Brown, Jordan Brown (brother)
 Rod Brown, Corey Brown (son)
 Tim Cahill,  Chris Cahill (brother),  Damien Fonoti (cousin)
 Leo Carle, Nick Carle (brother)
 Amy Chapman, Georgia Chapman (twin sister)
 Scott Chipperfield,  Liam Chipperfield (son)
 John Coyne, Chris Coyne, Jamie Coyne (sons), Aidan Coyne (grandson/son of Chris)
 Jason Culina (see  Branko Culina)
 Jock Cumberford, Dave Cumberford (brother)
 Alan Davidson, Jason Davidson (son)
 Thomas Deng (see  Peter Deng)
 Alistair Edwards, Cameron Edwards, Ryan Edwards (sons)
 Callum Elder (see  Paddy Turner)
 Ahmad Elrich, Tarek Elrich (brother)
 Frank Farina, Zenon Caravella (nephew)
 Ivan Franjic, Joseph Franjic (brother)
 Ciara Fowler, Mary Fowler (sister)
 Alex Gibb, Lex Gibb (son)
 Adam Griffiths, Joel Griffiths (twin brother), Ryan Griffiths (brother)
 Andy Henderson, Bill Henderson (son)
 Steve Hogg, Kahlia Hogg (daughter)
 Bernie Ibini-Isei, Princess Ibini-Isei (sister)
 Tomi Juric, Deni Juric (brother)
 Leena Khamis, Sham Khamis (sister)
 Alou Kuol, Garang Kuol (brother)
 Percy Lennard, Jack Lennard (son)
 Jamie Maclaren (see  Donald MacLaren)
 John Markovski, Tom Markovski (brother), Maja Markovski (niece/Tom's daughter)
 Garry McDowall,  Kenny McDowall (brother)
 Ryan McGowan, Dylan McGowan (brother)
 Brodie Mooy, Aaron Mooy (cousin)
 Damian Mori, Joshua Mori (son)
 Joe Mullen, Daniel Mullen (son), Matthew Mullen, Alex Mullen (nephews)
 Bugsy Nyskohus, John Nyskohus (brother)
 Jason Petkovic, Michael Petkovic (brother)
 Dimitri Petratos, Kosta Petratos, Maki Petratos (brothers)
 Tony Popovic, Kristian Popovic, Gabriel Popovic (sons)
 Mark Robertson,  Alexander Robertson (son)
 Mark Schwarzer,  Julian Schwarzer (son)
 Gema Simon, Kyah Simon (cousin)
 Robbie Slater, Tom Slater (son)
 Harry Souttar (see  John Souttar)
 Ashleigh Sykes, Nicole Begg (née Sykes) (twin sister)
 Cliff van Blerk, Jason van Blerk (son)
 Gary van Egmond, Emily van Egmond (daughter)
 Aurelio Vidmar, Tony Vidmar (brother), Mikayla Vidmar (niece/daughter of Tony)
 Dario Vidošić (see  Rado Vidošić)
 Mark Viduka,  Luka Modrić (cousin)
 Rhys Williams, Aryn Williams, Ryan Williams (brothers)
 Tameka Yallop (see  Kirsty Yallop)
 Ned Zelić, Ivan Zelic (brother), Lucy Zelic (sister)
 Andrew Zinni, Stefan Zinni (son)

Barbados
 Fabian Forde,  Shaq Forde (son)
 Louie Soares,  Tom Soares (brother)

Bermuda
 Andrew Bascome, David Bascome (brother), Drewonde Bascome (nephew), Osagi Bascome (nephew)

Bolivia
 Julio César Baldivieso, Mauricio Baldivieso (son)
 Diego Bejarano, Danny Bejarano (cousin)
 Ramiro Dalence, Martin Smedberg-Dalence (son)
 José Carlo Fernández, Genaro Fernández (brother), Cristian Fernández (son)
 Ronald García, Ignacio García (brother)
 Limberg Gutiérrez Sr., Limberg Gutiérrez Jr. (son)
 Marcelo Martins (see  Mauro Martins)
 Milton Melgar, Milton Erick Melgar (son), Sebastián Melgar (grand-nephew)
 Álvaro Peña,  (brother)
 Juan Manuel Peña, Adrián Peña (son)
 William Ramallo, Rodrigo Ramallo (son)
 Jesús Sagredo, José Sagredo (twin brother)
 Erwin Sánchez, Erwin Junior Sánchez (son)
 Marco Sandy, Daniel Sandy (son)
 Wilder Zabala, Leonardo Zabala (nephew)

Brazil 
 Adalberto,  Rodrigo (son)
 Marcos Assunção (see  Marcos Senna)
 Bebeto, Mattheus (son)
 Bernardo, Bernardo Jr. (son)
 Leandro Castán, Luciano Castán (brother)
 César Maluco, Luisinho Lemos (brothers)
 Cocada, Müller (brother)
 Edu Coimbra, Zico (brother), Júnior Coimbra, Thiago Coimbra (nephews, sons of Zico),  Eduardo Quaresma (distant relative)
 , Domingos da Guia (brother), Ademir da Guia (nephew/son of Domingos)
 Djalma Dias, Djalminha (son)
 Dondinho, Pelé (son), Zoca (son), Edinho, Joshua (grandsons, sons of Pelé), Octavio Felinto (great-grandson)
 Doni, João Paulo (brother)
 Dudu, Dorival Júnior (nephew), Lucas Silvestre (son of Dorival Júnior)
 Eric, Rodrygo (son)
 Garrincha, Jimmy dos Santos (brother)
 Geraldo Assoviador,  Geraldo Alves,  Bruno Alves,  Júlio Alves (nephews)
 Giovanni,  Emerson Palmieri (brother)
 Anfilogino Guarisi (see  Manuel Augusto Marques)
 Jairzinho, Jair Ventura (son)
 Josimar, Josimar Júnior (son)
 Juninho (born November 1989), Bruno Henrique (brother)
 Juninho (born January 1989), Ricardo Goulart (brother)
 Kaká, Digão (brother), Eduardo Delani (cousin)
 Leandro, Dedé, Cacá (brothers)
 Leivinha, Lucas Leiva (nephew)
 Lela, Alecsandro, Richarlyson (sons),  Deco (Alecsandro's brother-in-law)
 Luisão, Alex Silva, Andrei Silva (brothers)
 Marcelinho Carioca, Lucas Surcin, Matheus Surcin (sons), Marquinhos (nephew)
 Mauro Martins,  Marcelo Martins (son)
 Matheus Paquetá, Lucas Paquetá (brother)
 Mazinho,  Thiago (son), Rafinha (son)
 Jorge Morgenstern,  Jadir Morgenstern  (brother)
 Zezé Moreira, Aymoré Moreira, Ayrton Moreira (brothers)
 Muriel, Alisson Becker (brother)
 Neymar Sr., Neymar Jr. (son)
 ,  Otávio Fantoni (cousin), Niginho,  (brothers), Fernando,  Benito Fantoni (sons)
 , Osmar Magalhães (brother), Thiago Pereira, Rafael Magalhães (nephews),  Paulo Magalhães (nephew, son of Osmar)
 Marcos Pereira, Andreas Pereira (son)
 , Quarentinha (son)
 Rafael, Fábio (twin brother)
 Rivaldo, Rivaldinho (son)
 Romário, Romarinho (son)
 Ronaldinho, Assis (brother), João Mendes (son) Diego Assis (nephew)
 Ronaldo, Milene Domingues (ex-wife)
 Silas, Paulo Pereira (twin brother)
 Sócrates, Raí (brother)
 Amauri Stival, Cuca, Cuquinha (brothers)
 Tite, Matheus Bachi (son)
 Carlos Alberto Torres, Alexandre Torres (son)
 Valdomiro, Maicon (great-nephew)
 Jonilson Veloso, Dante (nephew)
 Wagner,  Ricardo Baiano (brother)
 Waldo, Wanderley (brother)
 Wladimir, Gabriel (son)
 Zague,  Luís Roberto Alves (son)
 Zé Elias, Rubinho (brother)
 Zizinho,   (son),  Giovani dos Santos,  Jonathan dos Santos (sons, half-brothers of Éder)

Brunei 
 Abdul Azizi Ali Rahman, Azwan Ali Rahman (brother)
 Hardi Bujang, Mardi Mirza Abdullah (twin brother)
 Jefry Mohammad, Moksen Mohammad (brother)
 Shahrazen Said, Amalul Said (brother), Ahmad Hafiz Said (brother), Adi Said (brother), Hakeme Yazid Said (brother)
 Amir Ajmal Tahir, Aminuddin Zakwan Tahir (brother)

Cambodia
 Keo Sokngon, Keo Sokpheng (brother)
 Um Vichet, Um Sereyroth (brother)

Canada
 Sam Adekugbe,  Elijah Adekugbe (brother)
 Brian Birch, Will Johnson (grandson)
 Alex Bunbury,  Teal Bunbury, Mataeo Bunbury (sons)
 Marco Bustos,  Melissa Bustos (sister)
Dwayne De Rosario, Osaze De Rosario, Adisa De Rosario (sons)
 Sherif El-Masri,  Mariam El-Masri (sister)
 Mauro Eustáquio, Stephen Eustáquio (brother)
 Brian Gant, Bruce Gant (brother), Christine Sinclair (niece of Brian and Bruce)
 Julian de Guzman,  Jonathan de Guzmán (brother)
 John Kerr, Sr.,  John Kerr, Jr. (son)
 Richie Laryea, Reggie Laryea (brother)
 Sam Lenarduzzi, Vanni Lenarduzzi, Bob Lenarduzzi, Danny Lenarduzzi (brothers)
 Issey Nakajima-Farran, Paris Nakajima-Farran (brother)
 Noble Okello (see  Denis Obua)
 Jonathan Osorio, Anthony Osorio, Nicholas Osorio (brothers)
 Mason Trafford, Charlie Trafford (cousin)

Cayman Islands
 Rico Bodden, Rico Bodden Jr. (son)
 Andrew Holness, Albertini Holness (son)
 Luis Morejon, Devonte Morejon (son)
 Antwan Seymour, Ernie Seymour (brother)

Chile
 José Abarca,  Diego Abarca (son), Jorge Acuña (cousin-in-law)
 , Ricardo Abumohor (son), Constantino Mohor (distant relative)
 , Williams Alarcón Jr. (son)
 Miiko Albornoz (see  Mauricio Albornoz)
 Patricio Almendra, Jonathan Almendra (brother)
 Luis Hernán Álvarez, Cristián Álvarez, Iván Álvarez (twin sons)
 Manuel Álvarez, Mario Álvarez (brother)
 Franz Arancibia, Leopoldo Arancibia, Eduardo Arancibia, Roque Arancibia (brothers), Francisco Arancibia (nephew/son of Leopoldo)
 Manuel Arancibia, Carlos Arancibia (brother)
 Charles Aránguiz, Mario Sandoval (cousin)
 Orlando Aravena, Jorge Aravena (nephew)
 Karen Araya, Bernardo Araya (brother)
 Francisco Arellano, David Arellano, Guillermo Arellano (brothers)
 Juan Arias, Antonio Arias, Óscar Arias, Enrique Arias, Jorge Arias, Miguel Ángel Arias (brothers) 
 Mauricio Aros, Joaquín Aros (son)
 Hugo Berly, Jaime Berly (brother)
 Hernán Bolaños (see  Costa Rica)
 Eduardo Bonvallet,  (son)
 Christian Bravo Sr., Christian Bravo Jr. (son)
 Félix Cantín, José Luis Sierra Sr. (grandnephew), José Luis Sierra Jr. (son of José Luis Sr.), Sebastián Miranda (brother-in-law of José Luis Sr.), Benjamín Sierra (nephew of José Luis Sr. and Sebastián)
 Rafael Caroca, Ignacio Caroca, Matías Caroca (brothers)
 Osvaldo Carvajal, Voltaire Carvajal (brother)
 Hernán Carvallo, Fernando Carvallo, Luis Hernán Carvallo (sons)
 Luis Casanova Sr., Luis Casanova Jr. (son)
 Víctor Castañeda, Rolando Castañeda, Hugo Castañeda,  (brothers), Víctor Hugo Castañeda, Cristián Castañeda (nephews/sons of Hugo)
 Óscar Castro, Niklas Castro (grandson)
 Luis Ceballos, Sergio Ceballos (brother)
 Luis Chavarría, Luis Cabezas (nephew)
 Raúl Coloma, Julio Coloma (brother), Luis Coloma (son)
 Julio Córdova, Jorge Córdova (brother)
 Fernando Cornejo Sr., Fernando Cornejo Jr. (son)
 Marco Cornez, Nicolás Córdova (son)
 Humberto Cruz Sr., Humberto Cruz Jr., Claudio Cruz (sons)
 Ítalo Díaz, Paulo Díaz, Nicolás Díaz (sons)
 Carlos Dittborn, Santiago Dittborn (great-nephew)
 Juan Delgado, Felipe Delgado (brother)
 José Luis Donoso, Mauricio Donoso (brother)
 Hugo Droguett, Jaime Droguett (brother)
 Óscar Fabbiani,  Ricardo Fabbiani,  Ariel Fabbiani,  Daniel Fabbiani (brothers),  Cristian Fabbiani (nephew)
 Matías Fernández, Nazareno Fernández (brother)
 Pedro Fernández, Hernán Fernández (brother)
 Cristián Flores,  (son)
 Luis Flores Pizarro, Luis Flores Abarca (son)
 Alberto Fouillioux Sr., Alberto Fouillioux Jr. (son)
 Eduardo Fournier, Gianni Fournier (son)
 Pablo Galdames Sr., Pablo Galdames Jr., Thomas Galdames,  Benjamín Galdames (sons), Mathías Galdames (son/half-brother of Pablo Jr., Thomas and Benjamín)  Nerea Sánchez Millán (distant relative of Galdames brothers)
 Adán Godoy, Carlos Rivas Sr. (son-in-law)  Carlos Rivas Jr. (grandson/son of Carlos Sr.)
 Eduardo Gómez, Rubén Gómez, Omar Gómez,  (brothers)
 Aníbal González Sr.,  Aníbal González Jr. (son)
 Ricardo González, Richard González (son)
 ,  (brother)
 Orlando Gutiérrez, Felipe Gutiérrez (brother)
 Elías Hartard, Sofía Hartard (sister)
 César Henríquez, Ángelo Henríquez (brother)
 Alejandro Hisis,  (daughters)
 Carlos Hoffmann,  (brother), Reinaldo Hoffmann, Alejandro Hoffmann (nephews/sons of Reynaldo), Raúl González (son-in-law of Reynaldo), Mark González (grandnephew/son of Raúl)
 Carlos Hormazábal, Pablo Hormazábal (son)
 Gustavo Huerta Sr., Gustavo Huerta Jr., Fernando Huerta, Carlos Huerta (sons)
 Osvaldo Hurtado, Francisco Ugarte (brother-in-law)
 Luis Ibarra, Marcelo Pacheco (son-in-law)
 Ignacio Jeraldino, Juan Jeraldino (twin brother)
 Luis Jiménez, Francisco Arriagada (nephew-in-law)
 Félix Landa, Honorino Landa (brother)
 Francisco Las Heras Sr., Francisco Las Heras Jr. (son)
 Óscar Lee-Chong, Felipe Lee-Chong (son), Luis Lee-Chong (brother), Jaime Carreño (nephew)
 Mario Lepe,  (brother),  Ariel Uribe (cousin)
 , Sergio Livingstone (son), Andrés Livingstone, Mario Livingstone (grandsons/Sergio's nephews) 
 José López, Luis López (brother)
 Benjamín Lorca, Juan Lorca (nephew)
 Paulo Magalhães (see  Paulo César)
 Javier Margas, Catalina Margas (daughter), Luis Miguel Margas (son)
 Christian Martínez, Sebastián Martínez (brother)
 Gary Medel, Kevin Medel (brother)
 Rodrigo Meléndez, Javier Meléndez (son)
 Eugenio Méndez, Javier Méndez (brother)
 , Marcelo Salas (Sergio's niece's husband)
 Leonardo Monje, Joaquín Monje (son)
 , Carlos Araneda (nephew)
 Cristián Montecinos, Joaquín Montecinos (son)
 Clemente Montes (see  Richard Barroilhet)
 Horacio Muñoz, Bartolo Muñoz (brother)
 Luis Núñez, Bryan Núñez (son)
 ,  (son)
 Cristian Olivares, Richard Olivares (brother)
 Raúl Ormeño, Álvaro Ormeño,  (sons)
 , Luis Pérez (cousin)
 Guillermo Páez, Juan Páez (brother), Mauricio Pozo (son-in-law), Juan Pozo (Mauricio's father), Pablo Pozo, Nicolás Pozo (Mauricio's brothers)
 Atanasio Pardo, José Pardo (brother), Amalia Pardo (daughter), Claudio Bravo (grandson-in-law)
 Manuel Pedreros Sr.,  (brother), Manuel Pedreros Jr. (son)
 , Miguel Pinto (brother)
 Jaime Pizarro, Vicente Pizarro (son)
 Carlos Poblete Sr.,  Carlos Poblete Jr. (son)
 Ulises Poirier,  (grandnephew)
 Fernando Prieto, Andrés Prieto, Ignacio Prieto (sons)
 Pablo Puyol, Mariano Puyol (son)
 Aníbal Ramírez, Jaime Ramírez (son)
 Carlos Reinoso Sr.,  Carlos Reinoso Jr. (son)
 , Felipe Reynero (son)
 Rolando Rivera, Rodrigo Rivera (son)
 George Robledo, Ted Robledo (brother)
 Héctor Robles, Andrés Robles (son)
 Héctor Roco Sr., Marcial Roco (brother), Héctor Roco Jr. (son), Sebastián Roco (nephew/Marcial's son), Bastián Roco (grandnephew/Sebastián's son)
 Manuel Rodríguez Vega, Gabriel Rodríguez Vega, Juan Rodríguez Vega (brothers), Juan Rodríguez Rubio, Francisco Rodríguez Rubio (nephews/Juan's sons)
 Bernardino Rojas, Nino Rojas (son), Ángelo Sagal, Bastián Sagal (nephews)
 Eladio Rojas, Leonel Herrera Sr. (cousin), Leonel Herrera Jr. (son of Leonel)
 Luis Rojas Sr., Silvio Rojas, Luis Rojas Jr. (sons)
 Ildefonso Rubio, Hugo Rubio (son), Eduardo Rubio, Matías Rubio, Diego Rubio (grandsons/sons of Hugo)
 Mario Salinas Sr., Mario Salinas Jr. (son)
 Carlos Schneeberger, Eduardo Schneeberger (cousin)
 Joel Soto, José Soto (nephew)
 Humberto Suazo, Arantza Suazo, Grettel Suazo (daughters)
 Carlos Tejas, Carla Tejas (daughter)
 Rolando Torino,  Armando Melgar (son-in-law),  Pablo Melgar,  Javier Melgar (grandsons)
 Javiera Toro,  (brother)
 Juan Toro,  (grandson), Jorge Valdivia, Claudio Valdivia (grandsons/half-brothers of Hugo)
 Luka Tudor, Milan Tudor (son)
 Raimundo Tupper,  Javier González (cousin-nephew)
 Francisco Valdés, Sebastián González (nephew)
 Esteban Valencia Sr., Esteban Valencia Jr. (son)
 Sergio Vargas, Emanuel Vargas (son)
 Leonardo Véliz, Daniel Véliz (son)
 Arturo Vidal, Gonzalo Vásquez (cousin), Daniel Malhue (brother-in-law)
 , Andrés Vilches (brother)
 Moisés Villarroel,  (son)
 Gustavo Viveros, Ricardo Viveros (nephew), Juan Francisco Viveros (nephew/cousin of Ricardo)
 Fernando Wirth, Erwin Wirth, Óscar Wirth (sons), Rainer Wirth (grandson/son of Óscar)
 Guillermo Yávar, Jorge Yávar (brother)
 , Jorge Zelada (brother)

China
 Gao Zhongxun, Gao Zhunyi (son)
 Gao Sheng,  Takahiro Ko (son)
 Hao Haidong, Hao Haitao (cousin), Hao Runze (son)
 Jiang Jin, Jiang Hong (brother)
 Liu Tao, Song Xiaoli (wife)
 Peng Weiguo, Peng Weijun (brother)
 Sun Ji, Sun Xiang (twin brother)
 Tang Miao, Tang Xin (twin brother)
 Wang Huiliang, Wang Peng (son)
 Xie Hongjun, Xie Feng (son)
 Xie Yuxin, Xie Weijun (son)
 Yao Daogang, Yao Wei (sister)
 Zhang Chenglin, Zhang Chengxiang (brother)

Colombia
 Armando Amaya, José Amaya (son)
 Adolfo Andrade, Andrés Andrade (son)
 Juan Pablo Ángel, Tomás Ángel (son)
 Sergio Angulo,  (son)
 Paulo César Arango, Johan Arango (brother)
 Óscar Bolaño, Jorge Bolaño, Hugo Bolaño (sons)
 Wilmer Cabrera Sr., David Cabrera, Wilmer Cabrera Jr. (sons)
 Miguel Calero, Juan José Calero (son)
 Teófilo Campaz, Víctor Campaz (brother)
 ,  (brother),  (son)
 Luis Felipe Chará, Diego Chará, Yimmi Chará (brothers)
 Marco Coll, Mario Coll (son)
 , Wilman Conde Jr. (son)
 , Jhon Córdoba (son)
 Óscar Córdoba,  (daughter)
 Jaime Deluque, Marlon Deluque (son)
 Alfredo Di Stefano (see  Alfredo Di Stefano Sr.)
 Ernesto Díaz, Andrés Ernesto Díaz, Francisco Javier Díaz (sons)
 Hernán Escobar, Álex Escobar (son)
 Santiago Escobar, Andrés Escobar (brother)
 David Ferreira,  Jesús Ferreira (son)
 , Lucho García (son)
 Radamel García, Radamel Falcao (son)
 Julio Gaviria Sr., Julio Edgar Gaviria, Vides Gaviria, Osnid Gaviria (sons)
 Hernán Darío Gómez, Gabriel Gómez (brother)
 Oswaldo Mackenzie, Roberto Carlos Mackenzie, Nadim Mackenzie (brothers)
 , Pablo Armero (cousin)
 Santiago Montoya, Daniel Montoya (brother)
 Andrés Mosquera,  (brother)
 Óscar Muñoz Sr., Óscar Muñoz Jr. (son)
 , Jeison Murillo (brother)
 Carlos Navarro Montoya,  Ezequiel Navarro Montoya (son)
 Willington Ortiz,  (nephew)
 Nixon Perea,  Andrés Perea (son)
 Robinson Rentería, Wason Rentería, Carlos Rentería (brothers)
 Freddy Rincón, Manuel Rincón, Ignacio Rincón (brothers), Sebastián Rincón (son)
 Hugo Rodallega, Carmen Rodallega (cousin)
 Wilson Rodríguez, James Rodríguez (son), David Ospina (James' brother-in-law)
 John Jairo Tréllez, Santiago Tréllez (son)
 Pablo Valderrama, Carlos Valderrama Sr. (brother), Alex Valderrama, Pablo Valderrama Jr. (sons), Carlos Valderrama, Alan Valderrama, Ronald Valderrama (nephews/sons of Carlos Sr.), Miguel González Palacios (nephew of Carlos Sr.)
 Adolfo Valencia, José Adolfo Valencia (son)
 Ariel Valenciano, Iván Valenciano (son)
 Ramiro Viáfara, Julián Viáfara (son)
 Cristián Zapata, Duván Zapata (cousin)

Costa Rica
 Robert Arias, Aarón Salazar (nephew)
 Hernán Bolaños, Óscar Bolaños (brother)
 Jonathan Bolaños, Christian Bolaños (brother)
 Kenny Cunningham, Kevin Cunningham (twin brother)
 Jervis Drummond, Gerald Drummond (twin brother)
 Guillermo Elizondo Sr., Carlos Elizondo, Guillermo Elizondo Jr., Wálter Elizondo (sons)
 Alexandre Guimarães, Celso Borges (son)
 Ariel Lassiter (see  Roy Lassiter)
 Dennis Marshall Sr., Dennis Marshall Jr. (son)
 Roy Myrie, David Myrie (brother)
 Erick Rodríguez, Ariel Rodríguez (son)
 Bryan Ruiz, Yendrick Ruiz (brother)
 Alejandro Sequeira, Douglas Sequeira Sr. (brother), Douglas Sequeira Jr. (nephew/son of Douglas Sr.)
 Mauricio Solís, Erick Solís (brother)
 Vicente Wanchope, Javier Wanchope, Paulo Wanchope (sons)

Curaçao 
  Johnsen Bacuna, Leandro Bacuna, Juninho Bacuna (brothers)
 Charlison Benschop, Kevin Felida (nephew)
  ,  Benjamin Martha,  Angelo Martha (brothers)
 Javier Martina, Cuco Martina (brother)
 Shermaine Martina, Shermar Martina (twin brother)
 Dylan Timber,  Quinten Timber,  Jurriën Timber (brothers)
  Nuelson Wau, Nyron Wau (brother)

Dominican Republic 
 José Espinal, Vinicio Espinal (twin brother)
 Meagan Harbison,  Hailey Harbison (sister)
 Benji Núñez, Fran Núñez (twin brother)

Ecuador
 Óscar Achilier Sr., Jimmy Achilier (brother), Gabriel Achilier (sons)
 Walter Ayoví, Jaime Ayoví (cousin)
 Ermen Benítez, Christian Benítez (son), Cléber Chalá (father-in-law of Christian)
 Álex Bolaños, Miller Bolaños (brother), Alexander Bolaños (cousin)
 Abdalá Bucaram, Dalo Bucaram (son)
 Gabriel Campana, Leonardo Campana (great-grandson),  (Leonardo's maternal grandfather)
 Héctor Carabalí, Wilson Carabalí (cousin),  Omar Carabalí (son of Wilson)
 Alex Cevallos, José Francisco Cevallos (brother),  (son), José Cevallos,  (nephews/sons of José Francisco)
 Marlon de Jesús, Bryan de Jesús (brother)
 Raúl Guerrón, Joffre Guerrón (brother)
 Carlos Gruezo Sr., Carlos Gruezo Jr. (son)
 Eduardo Hurtado.  Érick Hurtado (son)
 Renato Ibarra, Romario Ibarra (brother)
 Javier Klimowicz (see  Diego Klimowicz)
 Jazmín Mercado, Wendy Villón (cousin)
 Néicer Reasco, Djorkaeff Reasco (son)
 Éder Valencia, Antonio Valencia (brother)

Egypt
 Ekramy El-Shahat, Sherif Ekramy (son)
 Yehia Emam, Hamada Emam (son), Hazem Emam (grandson, son of Hamada)

El Salvador 
 Dennis Alas, Jaime Alas (brother)
 Darwin Cerén, Óscar Cerén (brother), Brenda Cerén (sister)
 Ronald Cerritos, Alexis Cerritos (son)
 Luis Abraham Coreas, Salvador Coreas Sr., Víctor Coreas (brothers), Salvador Coreas Jr., Raúl Coreas (nephews of Luis, Salvador and Víctor)
 Cristian Esnal (see  Raúl Esnal)
 Francisco Jovel Sr., Francisco Jovel Jr. (son)
 Salvador Mariona, Javier Mariona (grandson)
 Joshua Pérez (see  Hugo Pérez)
 Pablo Punyed,  Renato Punyed (brother)
 Alex Roldan (see  Cesar Roldan)
 Alfredo Ruano, Mágico González (son-in-law), Mauricio González, Efraín González, Miguel González, Jesús González (Mágico's brothers), Rodrigo González (Mágico's son),  Jorge Werner (Mágico's son/half-brother of Rodrigo and Jorge G.), Jorge González (Mágico's son/half-brother of Rodrigo and Jorge W.)
 Juan Ramón Sánchez, Ramón Sánchez (son)
 Óscar Ulloa Sr., Óscar Ulloa Jr., Ricardo Ulloa (sons)
 Eriq Zavaleta (see  Greg Vanney)

Fiji 
 Al-Taaf Sahib, Mira Sahib (brother)
 Epeli Saukuru, Iosefo Verevou (brother)
 Ifraz Mohammed, Moustafa Mohammed (son)

French Guiana
 Florent Malouda (see  France)
 Sloan Privat, Stéphane Privat (brother)

Grenada 
 Delroy Facey, Danny Facey (brother)  Anthony Griffith (cousin)
 Antonio German, Ricky German (brother)
 Anthony Modeste, Patrick Modeste (brother)

Guadeloupe
 Jocelyn Angloma (see  France)
 Stéphane Auvray,  Kaïlé Auvray (son)
 Stevenson Casimir, Josué Casimir (brother)
 Yohann Thuram-Ulien (see  Lilian Thuram)
 Ronald Zubar, Stéphane Zubar (brother),  Claude Dielna (cousin)

Guam
 Shawn Nicklaw, Travis Nicklaw (brother)
 Alex Lee, Justin Lee (twin brother), Nate Lee (brother)

Guatemala
 Armando Melgar, Pablo Melgar (see  Rolando Torino)
 María Amanda Monterroso, Coralia Monterroso (sister)

Guyana
 Carl Cort, Leon Cort (brother)  Ruben Loftus-Cheek (half-brother)
 Briana De Souza, Kayla De Souza (sister)
 Julia Gonsalves, Olivia Gonsalves (sister)
 Reiss Greenidge,  Jordan Greenidge (brother)
 Ronayne Marsh-Brown, Keanu Marsh-Brown (brother)

Haiti
 Derrick Etienne, Darrell Etienne (twin brother), Derick Etienne Jr. & Omre Etienne (sons of Derrick), Danielle Étienne & Darice Etienne (daughters of Derrick), Darrell Etienne Jr. & Yien Etienne (sons of Darrell) 
 Joseph-Marion Leandré, Fritz Leandré (brother)
 Guy Saint-Vil, Roger Saint-Vil (brother)

Honduras 
 Ricardo Barrios, Alex Güity (half-brother)
 Wilmer Crisanto, Félix Crisanto (cousin)
 Edder Delgado, Juan Delgado (brother)
 Osman Elis Sr., Alberth Elis (sons)
 Juan Carlos Espinoza, Nahúm Espinoza (brother)
 Milton Palacios, Jerry Palacios, Wilson Palacios, Johnny Palacios, Edwin Palacios (brothers)
 Luis Ramos, Anthony Lozano (half-brother)
 René Suazo, Maynor Suazo (son), Nicolás Suazo, David Suazo, Rubén Suazo, Henry Suazo (nephews), Hendry Thomas (nephew), Marel Álvarez Sr.(cousin-nephew of David Suazo and bros), Marel Álvarez Jr. (son of Marel Sr.)

Hong Kong 
 Lee Wai Lim, Lee Hong Lim (brother)

Hungary

Italy

India 
 Subrata Bhattacharya, Sunil Chhetri (son-in-law),  Sushila Chhetri (mother of Sunil), Kharga B. Chhetri (father of Sunil)
 Michael Soosairaj, Michael Regin (brother)
 Syed Abdul Rahim, Syed Shahid Hakim (son)
 Jeakson Singh Thounaojam, Kritina Devi Thounaojam (sister), Amarjit Singh Kiyam (cousin)
 Pradip Kumar Banerjee, Prasun Banerjee (brother)
 Prabhsukhan Singh Gill, Gursimrat Singh Gill (brother)
 Jarnail Singh, Jagmohan Singh (son)
 Syed Sabir Pasha, Syed Suhail Pasha (son)
 Santosh Kashyap, Sameer Kashyap (son)

Indonesia 
 Maman Abdurrahman, Egi Melgiansyah (brother)
 Zaenal Arief, Yandi Munawar (brother)
 Irfan Bachdim, Kim Kurniawan (brother-in-law)
 Titus Bonai, Arthur Barrios Bonai (brother)
 Tonnie Cusell, Stefano Lilipaly (cousin)
 Yusuf Ekodono, Fandi Utomo (son), Wahyu Suboseto (son)
 Bagas Kaffa, Bagus Kahfi (twin brother)
 Indra Kahfi, Andritany Ardhiyasa (brother)
 Achmad Kurniawan, Kurnia Meiga (brother)
 Ramdani Lestaluhu, Rafid Lestaluhu (brother), Abduh Lestaluhu (Rafid's twin brother), and Pandi Lestaluhu (brother)
 Yustinus Pae, Victor Pae (brother)
 Ortizan Solossa, Nehemia Solossa (brother), Boaz Solossa (brother)
 Bejo Sugiantoro, Rachmat Irianto (son)
 Izaac Wanggai, Patrich Wanggai (brother), Imanuel Wanggai (cousin)
 Zulham Zamrun, Zulvin Zamrun (twin brother)

Iran
 Ahmad Reza Abedzadeh, Amir Abedzadeh (son)
 Ali Danaeifard, Iraj Danaeifard (son)
 Andranik Eskandarian,  Alecko Eskandarian (son)
 Mehrdad Mohammadi, Milad Mohammadi (twin brother)
 Serjik Teymourian, Andranik Teymourian (brother)
 Jamshid Nassiri,  Kiyan Nassiri (son)

Iraq 
 Khalil Allawi, Karim Allawi (brother)
 Adnan Dirjal, Muhannad Darjal (son)
 Ali Kadhim, Ali Adnan (nephew)
 Mustafa Mohammed, Muntadher Mohammed (brother)
 Hisham Ali Al-Rawi,  Bassam Al-Rawi (son)
 Suhail Saber,   Ahmed Suhail,   Rami Suhail (sons)

Israel
 Dori Arad, Ofri Arad (brother)
 Reuven Atar, Roi Atar (son)
 Eyal Berkovic, Nir Berkovic (brother)
 Alon Brumer, Gadi Brumer (twin brother)
 Jacob Buzaglo, Ohad Buzaglo, Asi Buzaglo, Maor Buzaglo, Almog Buzaglo (sons)
 Avi Cohen, Tamir Cohen (son)
 Mu'nas Dabbur, Anas Dabour (brother)
 Eli Dasa, Or Dasa (brother)
 Baruch Dego, Messay Dego (brother)
 Yehoshua Feigenbaum, Ronen Feigenbaum (son)
 Albert Gazal, Ravid Gazal (son)
 Mahmoud Jaber (see  Abdallah Jaber)
 Gad Machnes, Oded Machnes (twin brother)
 Baruch Maman, Hanan Maman (son)
 Haim Revivo, David Revivo, Shay Revivo (brothers)
 Ronny Rosenthal, Lior Rosenthal (brother), Tom Rosenthal (son)
 Itzhak Shum, Idan Shum (son)
 Shalom Tikva, Avi Tikva (brother)

Jamaica
 Robbie Earle,  Otis Earle (son)
 David Johnson,  Brennan Johnson (son)
 Onandi Lowe, Damion Lowe (son)
 Neville Oxford,  Reece Oxford (grandson of brother)
 Fitzroy Simpson,  Jordan Simpson (son)
 Frank Sinclair,  Tyrese Sinclair (son)
 Allyson Swaby, Chantelle Swaby (sister)
 Dennis Ziadie, Christopher Ziadie and Craig Ziadie (sons),  Mark Chung (cousin of Craig)

Japan
 Daiki Hashioka, Kazuki Hashioka (brother)
 Yasutoshi Miura, Kazuyoshi Miura (brother)
 Gōtoku Sakai, Noriyoshi Sakai (brother)

Jordan
 Stephanie Al-Naber, Yousef Al-Naber (brother)
 Bashar Bani Yaseen, Anas Bani Yaseen (uncle son)

Kazakhstan
 Peter Neustädter,  Roman Neustädter (son)

Kyrgyzstan 
 Ildar Amirov, Ruslan Amirov (brother)

Lebanon
 Fadi Alloush, Hiba Alloush (daughter)
 Levon Altounian, Manuel Altounian (brother)
 Roda Antar, Faisal Antar (brother)
 Ahmad El Choum, Sami El Choum (brother)
 Bilal Hachem, Yehia Hachem (brother)
 Jamal Al Haj, Ali Al Haj (son)
 Alexander Michel Melki, Felix Michel Melki (brother)
 Jadir Morgenstern (see  Jorge Morgenstern)
 Joan Oumari, Hassan Oumari (brother)
 Emile Rustom, Paul Rustom (son)
 Hussein Tahan, Mohamad Zein Tahan (brother)
 Haitham Zein, Mahdi Zein (nephew)

Macau
 Paulo Conde, Alexandre Matos (son)

Malaysia
 Aidil Zafuan Abdul Radzak, Zaquan Adha Abdul Radzak (twin brother)
 Zainal Abidin Hassan, Zaiza Zainal Abidin (son)
 Ali Bakar, Isa Bakar (brother)
 Natxo Insa, Kiko Insa (brother)
 Syamsul Saad, Shahrizal Saad (brother), Shahrul Saad (brother)

Mali

 Gaye Alassane,  Sameer Alassane (son)

Martinique
 Thierry Audel, Johan Audel (brother)
 Richard Massolin,  Yanis Massolin
 Fabrice Reuperné, Enrick Reuperné (son)
 Yann Thimon, Yordan Thimon (brother)

Mexico
 ,  (son)
 Luís Roberto Alves (see  Zague)
 Félix Araujo, Néstor Araujo (brother)
 Tomás Balcázar, Javier Hernández Sr. (son-in-law), Javier Hernández Jr. (son of Javier Sr.)
 George Corral, Charlyn Corral (sister)
 Leonardo Cuéllar, Christopher Cuéllar (son)
 Renae Cuéllar,  Carlos Alvarez (husband), Efraín Álvarez (brother-in-law, brother of Carlos)
 Flavio Davino, Duilio Davino (see  Jorge Davino)
 Antonio de Nigris, Aldo de Nigris (brother)
 Giovani dos Santos, Jonathan dos Santos (see  Zizinho)
 Ignacio Flores, Luis Flores (brother)
 Mónica Flores, Sabrina Flores (twin sister)
 Rubén Flores, Silvana Flores (daughter), Marcelo Flores (son)
 Rogelio Funes Mori (see  Ramiro Funes Mori)
 Benjamín Galindo Sr., Benjamín Galindo Jr. (son)
 Rafael Garza Gutiérrez, Francisco Garza Gutiérrez (brother)
 Christian Giménez, Santiago Giménez (son)
 Jonathan Gómez (see  Johan Gomez)
 Mauro Lainez, Diego Lainez (brother)
 Miguel Layún, José Abella (cousin)
 Gerardo Lugo, Édgar Lugo (son)
 Rafael Márquez Sr., Rafael Márquez Jr. (son), Luis Márquez (Rafael's cousin)
 Freddy Martín, Henry Martín (brother)
 Ramón Morales, Carlos Morales (brother)
 Luis Antonio Orozco, Luis Orozco, Javier Orozco (sons)
 Luis Pérez, Mario Pérez (son)
 Verónica Pérez, Amanda Pérez (sister)
 Onay Pineda, Orbelín Pineda (brother)
 Alfonso Portugal, Héctor Sánchez (father-in-law of Alfonso's daughter),  Hugo Sánchez Sr. (son-in-law/son of Héctor),  Hugo Sánchez Jr. (grandson/son of Hugo Sr.),  (nephew of Hugo Sr.)
 José Luis Puente, Rafael Puente Sr., Santiago Puente Sr. (brothers), Rafael Puente Jr. (nephew/son of Rafael Sr.), Santiago Puente Jr. (nephew/son of Santiago Sr.)
 Luis Regueiro (see  Corso)
 Salvador Reyes Sr., Salvador Reyes Jr. (son)
 Anika Rodríguez, Karina Rodríguez (sister)
 Felipe Rosas, Manuel Rosas, Juan Rosas (brothers)
 Carlos Salcedo (see  Nicolás Vikonis)
 José Sánchez,  Isidro Sánchez (son)
 José Vantolrá (see  Martí Ventolrà)
 Alejandro Vela, Carlos Vela (brother)

Montserrat
 Tesfaye Bramble,  Titus Bramble (brother)
 Dajour Buffonge,  DJ Buffonge (brother)
 Wayne Dyer,  Lloyd Dyer (brother)
 Matty Willock,  Chris Willock,  Joe Willock (brothers)

Myanmar
 Maung Maung Soe, Win Moe Kyaw (brother)

New Caledonia
 Georges Gope-Fenepej, John Gope-Fenepej (brother)

New Zealand 
 Ken Armstrong, Ron Armstrong (son), Brian Armstrong (son), Bridgette Armstrong (granddaughter, daughter of Ron)
 Dave Bright, Kris Bright (son), Rory Turner (Kris's half-brother)
 Michael Boxall, Nikko Boxall (brother)
 Clive Campbell, Jeff Campbell (son)
 Sara Clapham, Aaron Clapham (brother)
 Barbara Cox, Michele Cox (daughter), Tara Cox (daughter)
 Fred de Jong, Andre de Jong (son)
 Priscilla Duncan, Katie Duncan (wife)
 Declan Edge, Harry Edge (son), Jesse Edge (nephew)
 Kevin Fallon, Rory Fallon (son)
 Jai Ingham, Dane Ingham (brother)
 Michael McGarry, James McGarry (son)
 Bert Ormond,  Willie Ormond (brother), Ian Ormond (son), Duncan Ormond (son), Vicki Ormond (granddaughter, daughter of Duncan)
 Michael Ridenton, Matthew Ridenton (son)
 Shane Rufer, Wynton Rufer (brother), Caleb Rufer (son of Wynton), Alex Rufer (son of Shane)
 Vic Smith, Gordon Smith (brother), Roger Smith (brother), Ryan Nelsen (grandson of another brother, Bob Smith)
 Yvonne Vale, Jordan Vale (son)
 Frank van Hattum, Grazia MacIntosh (sister), Marie-Jose Cooper (sister), Oskar van Hattum (nephew)
 Chelsey Wood, Chris Wood (brother)
 Kirsty Yallop,  Tameka Yallop (née Butt) (wife)

Pakistan 
 Raheela Zarmeen, Shahlyla Ahmadzai (sister)

Palestine
 Edgardo Abdala, Joaquín Abdala (son)
 Abdallah Jaber,  Mahmoud Jaber (brother)

Panama
 Armando Dely Valdés, Jorge Dely Valdés, Julio Dely Valdés (brothers/twins)
 Donaldo González, Gabriel Gómez (brother-in-law)
 Víctor René Mendieta, Sr., Víctor René Mendieta, Jr. (son)
 Marcos Villarreal, José Luis Rodríguez (brother)

Paraguay
 Diego Barreto, Édgar Barreto (brother)
 Delfín Benítez Cáceres,  Gabriel Benítez (grandson)
 Rodrigo Bogarín, Dahiana Bogarín (sister)
 Hugo Brizuela,  Braulio Brizuela (brother)
 Luis Caballero, Luis Nery Caballero (son)
 Víctor Cáceres, Marcos Cáceres (brother)
 ,  Paulo Centurión (son)
 Rolando Chilavert, José Luis Chilavert (brother)
 Roberto Fernández, Roberto Júnior Fernández (son)
 Eligio Insfrán, Eliseo Insfrán (twin brother)
 Pedro López,  Steven Lopez,  Bryan Lopez (sons)
 Fidel Miño Sr., Fidel Miño Jr. (son)
 Eugenio Morel, Claudio Morel Rodríguez (son)
 Gerónimo Ovelar, Fernando Ovelar (grandson)
 , Roberto Ovelar (brother), Christian Ovelar (cousin)
 Óscar Romero, Ángel Romero (twin brother)
 Santiago Salcedo, Domingo Salcedo (brother)
 Óscar Santa Cruz, Roque Santa Cruz, Diego Santa Cruz, Julio Santa Cruz (brothers)

Papua New Guinea
 Selan Elizah, Pettysen Elizah (son)
 Andrew Embahe, Sonia Embahe (sister)
 Bob Morris, Rumona Morris (daughter)
 Peter Gunemba, Raymond Gunemba (son), Troy Gunemba (son), Judith Gunemba (daughter), Meagen Gunemba (daughter)
 Alwin Komolong, Felix Komolong (brother)

Peru 
  Luis Advíncula Sr.,  Luis Advíncula Jr. (son)
 Julio Baylón, Jahirsino Baylon (son),  (nephew)
 Juan Carlos Bazalar, Alonso Bazalar (son)
 Marcos Calderón, Julio Meléndez (nephew)
 Eloy Campos, Eloy Ortiz, César Loyola (nephews),  (great-nephew),  Joao Ortiz (nephew of Eloy Ortiz), Nilson Loyola (great-nephew/son of César)
 Xioczana Canales, Xiomara Canales (twin sister)
 José del Solar,  (brother), Álvaro Barco (brother-in-law)
 Guillermo Delgado, Erick Delgado (grandson)
 Alfonso Dulanto, Gustavo Dulanto (son)
 , Rafael Farfán (brother), Jefferson Farfán (nephew), Luis Guadalupe (Jefferson's uncle),  Quembol Guadalupe (Jefferson's cousin/Luis' nephew)
 Arturo Fernández, Teodoro Fernández, Eduardo Fernández (brothers)
 Edison Flores,  Xiao Taotao (brother-in-law)
 , Óscar Gómez Sánchez (brother), José Gonzáles, Carlos Gonzáles (nephews), Julio Rivera (nephew of José and Carlos), Paolo Guerrero (nephew of José and Carlos/half-brother of Julio)
 Alejandro Hohberg (see  Juan Hohberg)
 , Hugo Lobatón, Pablo Lobatón (brothers), Carlos Lobatón Donayre (cousin), Abel Lobatón Sr., Manuel Lobatón (cousins), Abel Lobatón Jr., Carlos Lobatón, Jhilmar Lobatón (cousin-nephews/sons of Abel Sr.)
 , Manuel Mellán (brother)
 Ramón Mifflin Sr.,  Ramón Mifflin Jr. (son)
 , Máximo Mosquera (brother), Nemesio Mosquera (half-brother), Roberto Mosquera (son)
 Walter Ormeño, Santiago Ormeño (grandson)
 Claudio Pizarro, Diego Pizarro (brother)
 Alberto Ramírez, Luis Ramírez (grandson)
 Willy Rivas, Fernando Pacheco (nephew)
 Caroline Shevlin, Grace Shevlin (twin sister)
 José Soto, Jorge Soto,  (brothers)
 Alexander Succar, Matías Succar (brother)
 Julio César Uribe, Édson Uribe (son)
 Walter Vílchez, Óscar Vílchez (brother)

Philippines 
 Marwin Angeles, Marvin Angeles (twin)
 Yanti Barsales, Ian Araneta (nephew), Emelio Caligdong (Ian's third cousin), Alina Araneta (niece/Ian's sister)
 Anton del Rosario, Armand del Rosario (brother)
 Sara Castañeda, Anicka Castaneda (sister)
 Chris Greatwich, Phil Greatwich, Simon Greatwich (brothers)
 Ángel Guirado, Juan Luis Guirado (brother)
 Darren Hartmann, Matthew Hartmann, Mark Hartmann (brothers)
 Chandler McDaniel, Olivia Davies-McDaniel (sister)
 Omid Nazari, Amin Nazari (brother)
 Ed Ocampo, Javier Gayoso (grandson)
 Manuel Ott, Mike Ott (brother), Marco Ott (brother)
 Álvaro Silva, Kike Linares (cousin)
 Jefferson Tabinas, Paul Tabinas
 Phil Younghusband, James Younghusband (brother)

Puerto Rico
 Joshua Calderón, Giovanni Calderón (brother)
 Alexa Cardona, Julian Cardona (brother)

Qatar 
 Ibrahim Khalfan, Khalfan Ibrahim (son)
 Mohammed Yasser. Hussein Yasser, Ahmed Yasser (brothers)

Saint Kitts and Nevis
 Bobby Bowry,  Daniel Bowry (son)
 Cloey Uddenberg, Kayla Uddenberg (sister), Cloey Uddenberg (sister)
 Tiran Hanley, Tishan Hanley (brother), Tahir Hanley (brother)
 Atiba Harris,  Micah Richards (cousin)
 Lois Maynard,  Marcus Rashford (cousin)
 Allison Williams, Lauren Williams (sister)

Saint Lucia
 Titus Elva, Olivier Elva (brother),  Caniggia Elva (son)

Saint Martin
 Wilfried Dalmat (see  Stéphane Dalmat)

Samoa
 Matalena Daniells, Kevin Daniells (brother)
 Johnny Hall,  Jai Ingham (cousin),  Dane Ingham (cousin/Jai's brother)

Saudi Arabia
 Osama Hawsawi, Omar Hawsawi (brother)

Singapore
 Khairul Amri, Khairul Nizam (brother)
 Au-yeong Pak Kuan,  Daniel Au Yeong (son)
 Swandi Kitto, Adam Swandi (son)
 Zulfadhmi Suzliman, Zulqarnaen Suzliman (brother).
 Ahmad Wartam, Fandi Ahmad (son), Irfan Fandi (grandson, son of Fandi), Ikhsan Fandi (grandson, son of Fandi), Ilhan Fandi (grandson, son of Fandi)

Solomon Islands
 Allan Boso, Turiti Boso (son)
 Duddley Tausinga, Abel Karina (Cousin), Spencer Manga (Cousin)

South Korea
 Cha Bum-kun, Cha Du-ri (son)
 Choi Yung-keun, Choi Chung-min (brother)
 Kim Pan-keun,  Danny Kim (son)
 Son Woong-jung, Son Heung-min (son)

Suriname
 Roland Alberg (see  Ibad Muhamadu)
 Frank Borgia, Kenneth Borgia (brother)
 Wensley Bundel, Rosano Bundel (son)
 Mitchell Donald,  Joël Donald (brother)
 Giovanni Drenthe (see  Royston Drenthe)
 Errol Emanuelson,  Julian Emanuelson,  Urby Emanuelson (sons), Roché Emanuelson (nephew),  Jean-Paul Boëtius (cousin of Julian & Urby)
 Roxey Fer, Donnegy Fer (brother)
 Iwan Fränkel, Ray Fränkel (son), Purrel Fränkel (nephew)
 Dean Gorré,  Kenji Gorré (son)
 Jacques Alex Hasselbaink,  Jimmy Floyd Hasselbaink,  Carlos Hasselbaink (nephews), Nigel Hasselbaink (second nephew),  Marvin Hasselbaink (second nephew-cousin of Nigel),  Mitchell Piqué (cousin-nephew of Nigel)
 Kenneth Jaliens,  Kew Jaliens (nephew)
 Kenneth Kluivert,  Patrick Kluivert (son),  Justin Kluivert,  Ruben Kluivert (grandsons/son of Patrick)
 Leo Kogeldans,  Ruben Kogeldans (son)
 Humphrey Mijnals, Frank Mijnals, Stanley Mijnals (brothers)
 Frank Rigters, Delano Rigters (son), Gregory Rigters (grandson)
 Herman Rijkaard,  Frank Rijkaard (son)
 Johann Seedorf,  Clarence Seedorf,  Jürgen Seedorf,  Chedric Seedorf (sons),  Stefano Seedorf,  Rahmlee Seedorf,  Collin Seedorf,  Cain Seedorf (nephews)
 Roy Vanenburg,  Gerald Vanenburg (nephew),  Jermaine Vanenburg (nephew/cousin of Gerald)
 Ricardo Winter,  Aron Winter (cousin)

Syria
 Mosab Balhous, Anas Balhous (brother)
 Mouhanad Boushi, Nihad Al Boushi (brother)
 Aatef Jenyat, Amro Jenyat (brother)
 Abdul Kader Kardaghli, Ahmed Kurdughli (brother)
 Kevork Mardikian, Mardik Mardikian (son)
 Munaf Ramadan, Ammar Ramadan (son)

Tahiti
 Efraín Araneda, Diego Araneda (son)
 Erroll Bennett, Naea Bennett, Steven Bennett (sons), Marama Vahirua (Naea's cousin),  Pascal Vahirua (Marama's cousin)
 Eddy Kaspard (see  Abet Kaspard Tahi)
 Jonathan Tehau, Alvin Tehau, Lorenzo Tehau (brothers, twins), Teaonui Tehau (cousin)

Tajikistan
 Alisher Dzhalilov, Iskandar Dzhalilov, Manuchekhr Dzhalilov, Dzhakhongir Dzhalilov (brother)
 Khakim Fuzailov, Rahmatullo Fuzailov (brother)
 Dilshod Vasiev, Farkhod Vosiyev (brother)

Thailand
 Samruay Chaiyong, Sa-ner Chaiyong, Sanong Chaiyong, Sa-nook Chaiyong,Supot Chaiyong, Supat Chaiyong
 Sutin Chaikitti, Surak Chaikitti (brother)
 Teraseel Dangda, Taneekarn Dangda (sister)
 Somjets Kesarat, Tanaboon Kesarat (brother)
 Pairote Pongjan, Thitipan Puangchan (son)
 Surat Sukha, Suree Sukha (twin brother)
 Supachok Sarachat, Suphanat Mueanta (brother)

Tonga

 Mark Uhatahi, Sione Uhatahi (brother), Tupou Uhatahi (brother), Pita Uhatahi (brother)

Trinidad and Tobago
 Ian Cox, Daniel Phillips (cousin)
 Khadidra Debesette, Khadisha Debesette (twin sister)
 Andre Fortune II, Ajani Fortune (brother)
 Nathaniel García, Levi García, Judah García (brothers)
 Justin Hoyte, Gavin Hoyte (brothers)
 Kelvin Jones, Marvin Jones (son), Joevin Jones (son), Alvin Jones (son)
 Wendell Moore,  Shaquell Moore (son)
 Lincoln Phillips, Derek Phillips (son)
 Ross Russell Sr., Ross Russell Jr. (son)
 Scott Sealy,  Dante Sealy (son)
 Silvio Spann, Silas Spann (brother)

Turkmenistan
 Wladimir Baýramow, Nazar Baýramow (brother)
 Dmitri Nezhelev, Anatoli Nezhelev (brother)
 Kamil Mingazow, Ruslan Mingazow (son)

United Arab Emirates
 Khaled Abdulrahman, Mohamed Abdulrahman (brother), Omar Abdulrahman (brother)
 Mohammed Salem Al-Enazi, Mohanad Salem (brother)
 Mubarak Ghanim, Khalil Ghanim (brother)
 Khalil Sebait, Fahd Khalil (son), Fouad Khalil (son), Faisal Khalil (son), Fathi Khalil (son), Mohamed Khalil (son), Ahmed Khalil (son)
 Eissa Meer, Ibrahim Meer (twin brother)

United States
 Bruce Arena, Kenny Arena (son)
 Yael Averbuch West, Aaron West (husband), Shira Averbuch (sister)
 Walter Bahr, Casey Bahr, Chris Bahr, Matt Bahr (sons)
 Gerry Baker,  Joe Baker (brother)
 DaMarcus Beasley, Jamar Beasley (brother)
 Matt Besler, Nick Besler (brother)
 Kimberly Bingham, David Bingham (brother)
 Bob Bradley, Michael Bradley (son),  Andy Rose (son-in-law)
 Jim Brown, George Brown (see  Alex Lambie)
 Teal Bunbury (see  Alex Bunbury)
 Servando Carrasco, Alex Morgan (wife)
 Mark Chung (see  Dennis Ziadie)
 Kenny Cooper Jr. (see  Kenny Cooper Sr.)
 Rolf Decker, Otto Decker (brother)
 Angelo DiBernardo, Paul DiBernardo (brother)
 Daryl Dike (see  Bright Dike)
 Alecko Eskandarian (see  Andranik Eskandarian)
 Lorrie Fair, Ronnie Fair (twin sister)
 Jesús Ferreira (see  David Ferreira)
 William Findlay (see  Robert Findlay)
 Jim Gabarra, Carin Jennings-Gabarra (wife)
 Fabrice Gautrat, Morgan Gautrat (wife)
 Johan Gomez,  Jonathan Gómez (brother)
 Phillip Gyau, Joe Gyau (see  Nana Gyau)
 John Harkes, Ian Harkes (son)
 Chris Henderson, Sean Henderson (brother)
 Schellas Hyndman, Emerson Hyndman (grandson)
 Erhardt Kapp, Alex Kapp (son)
 Harry Keough, Ty Keough (son)
 John Kerr Jr. (see  John Kerr Sr.)
 Alexi Lalas, Greg Lalas (brother)
 Roy Lassiter,  Ariel Lassiter (son)
 Sydney Leroux, Dom Dwyer (husband)
 Maurice Ligeon,  Ruben Ligeon (brother)
 Joe Maca, Alain Maca (son)
 Dax McCarty, Dustin McCarty (brother)
 Charlie McCully, Henry McCully (brother)
 Bart McGhee (see  James McGhee)
 Neil Megson (see  Don Megson)
 Kristie Mewis, Sam Mewis (sister)
 Shaq Moore (see  Wendell Moore)
 Charlotte Moran, Desiree Fray (daughter),   Michael Fray (son-in-law/Desiree's husband),  Marlee Fray (granddaughter/daughter of Michael & Desiree), Ian Fray (grandson/son of Desiree & Michael)
 Darlington Nagbe (see  Joe Nagbe)
 George Nanchoff, Louis Nanchoff (brother), Michael Nanchoff (son)
 Victor Nogueira, Casey Nogueira (daughter), Zach Loyd (son-in-law/Casey's husband)
 Andrés Perea (see  Nixon Perea)
 Hugo Pérez,  Joshua Pérez (nephew)
 Mark Pulisic, Christian Pulisic (son), Will Pulisic (nephew)
 Brian Quinn, Aodhan Quinn (son)
 Christie Rampone (see  Bill Dowie)
 Megan Rapinoe, Rachael Rapinoe (twin sister)
 Harry Ratican, Peter Ratican (brother)
 Claudio Reyna, Danielle Egan (wife), Giovanni Reyna (son)
 Cesar Roldan, Cristian Roldan,  Alex Roldan (brothers)
 Gabe Rosario,  Robert Rosario (father)
 Brandon Servania,  Jaden Servania (brother)
 Ken Snow, Steve Snow (brother)
 Archie Stark, Tommy Stark (brother)
 Larry Sullivan, Quinn Sullivan (grandson), Chris Albright (cousin of Quinn)
 Gregg Thompson, Tanner Thompson, Tommy Thompson (sons)
 Tim Twellman, Steve Twellman, Mike Twellman (brothers), Taylor Twellman (son)
 Julian Valentin,  Zarek Valentin (brother)
 Greg Vanney,  Eriq Zavaleta (nephew)
 Abby Wambach, Sarah Huffman (wife)
 George Weah Jr., Timothy Weah (see  George Weah)
 Roy Wegerle,  Steve Wegerle,  Geoff Wegerle (brothers), Bryce Wegerle (nephew/Steve's son)
 Chris Wondolowski, Stephen Wondolowski (brother)

Uruguay
 Sebastián Abreu,  (son)
 Óscar Aguirregaray, Matías Aguirregaray (son), Gastón Guruceaga (nephew-in-law/cousin of Matías)
 Diego Alonso, Iván Alonso, Matías Alonso (cousins)
 Atilio Ancheta, Rafa Ancheta (granddaughter)
 José Leandro Andrade, Víctor Rodríguez Andrade (nephew)
 Gustavo Badell, Yamila Badell (daughter)
 Enrique Báez, Jaime Báez (son)
 Adolfo Barán, Nicolás Barán, Santiago Barán,  (sons)
 Eber Bueno, Carlos Bueno (son)
 Osvaldo Canobbio, Agustín Canobbio (son)
 Jorge Daniel Cardaccio, Mathías Cardaccio (nephew), Belén Cardaccio (niece/Mathías' sister)
 Fabián Coelho,  (son)
 Juan Carlos Corazzo, Pablo Forlán (son-in-law), Diego Forlán (son of Pablo)
 Gabriel Correa, Yannel Correa (daughter)
 Jorge da Silva, Rubén da Silva (brother)
 Víctor Diogo, Carlos Diogo (son)
 Raúl Esnal,  Cristian Esnal (son)
 ,  Pedro Fernández (son)
 Darío Flores, Robert Flores (brother)
 Daniel Fonseca,  Nicolás Fonseca,  Matías Fonseca (sons)
 Marcelo Fracchia, Matías Fracchia (son)
 Enzo Francescoli,  (son)
 Walter Gargano,  Marek Hamšík (brother-in-law)
 Gervasio González,  Andreé González (son)
 Juan González, Giovanni González (son)
 Néstor Gonçalves, Jorge Gonçálvez (son)
 Walter Guglielmone, Christian Cavani, Edinson Cavani (half-brothers)
 José Herrera, Claudio Herrera (son), Diego Godín (son-in-law)
 Juan Hohberg,  Alejandro Hohberg (grandson)
 Diego López,  Thiago López (son)
 Alberto Martínez,  Sebastián Martínez (son)
 Roberto Matosas, Gustavo Matosas (son)
 Gisleno Medina,  (brother)
 Julio Montero Castillo, Paolo Montero (son)
 Sergio Navarro, Agustín Navarro (son)
 Washington Olivera, Bryan Olivera (son)
 Santiago Ostolaza Sr., Santiago Ostolaza Jr. (son)
 Walter Pandiani, Nico Pandiani (son)
 Gustavo Poyet, Marcelo Poyet (brother), Diego Poyet (son)
 Álvaro Recoba, Julio Recoba (son)
 Climaco Rodríguez, Coquito (nephew),  Álvaro Rodríguez (great-nephew, son of Coquito)
 Carlos Sánchez, Nicolás De La Cruz (half-brother), Facundo Trinidad (nephew)
 Carlos Scarone, Héctor Scarone (brother)
 Raúl Schiaffino,  Juan Alberto Schiaffino (brother)
 Andrés Scotti, Diego Scotti (brother)
 , Sebastián Sosa, Nicolás Sosa (sons)
 Damián Suárez, Mathías Suárez (brother)
 Paolo Suárez, Luis Suárez (brother)
 Obdulio Varela, Luis Varela (cousin)
 Matías Velázquez, Emiliano Velázquez (brother)
 Waldemar Victorino, Mauricio Victorino (nephew)
 Ondino Viera, Milton Viera (son)
 Nicolás Vikonis,  Carlos Salcedo (brother-in-law)
 José Zalazar,  Kuki Zalazar, Rodrigo Zalazar (sons)

Uzbekistan
 Ruslan Agalarov,  Kamil Agalarov (brother),  Gamid Agalarov (son)

Vanuatu
 Michel Kaltak, Jean Kaltak (brother), Brian Kaltak (cousin)
 Abet Kaspard Tahi,  Eddy Kaspard (son)

Venezuela
 Bernardo Añor Sr., Bernardo Añor Jr., Juan Pablo Añor (sons)
 Jhonny Arocha, Rubén Arocha (son)
 Gabriel Benítez (see  Delfín Benítez Cáceres)
 Cristian Cásseres Sr., Cristian Cásseres Jr. (son)
 Luigi Mauro Cichero, Alejandro Cichero, Gabriel Cichero, Mauro Cichero (sons)
 Ramón Echenausi, Miguel Echenausi (son)
 Freddy Elie, Roberto Elie (brother)
 César Farías, Daniel Farías (brother)
 Frank Feltscher, Rolf Feltscher (brother),  Mattia Desole (step-brother)
 Pedro Fernández (see  Roque Fernández)
 Nahuel Ferraresi (see  Adolfo Ferraresi)
 Andreé González (see  Gervasio González)
 Javier González (see  Raimundo Tupper)
 Joel Graterol, Jorge Graterol (brother)
 Jonay Hernández, Dani Hernández (brother)
 Andrés Jiménez, Leopoldo Jiménez (son)
 Coromoto Lucena, Pedro Lucena, Johnny Lucena, Franklin Lucena, Ronaldo Lucena (sons)
 Christian Makoun (see  Bayoi Makoun)
 Carlos Maldonado, Giancarlo Maldonado (son),  (Giancarlo's uncle), Javier Maldonado, Andrés Maldonado (Giancarlo's cousins)
 Rafael Mea Vitali, Miguel Mea Vitali (brother)
 Luis Alfredo Mendoza, Luis Carlos Mendoza (son)
 Júnior Moreno (see  Carlos Horacio Moreno)
 Richard Páez, Raymond Páez, Andrew Páez (brothers), Ricardo Páez (son), Gustavo Páez, Diego Páez (nephews, sons of Raymond, cousins of Ricardo), Ayrton Páez (nephew, son of Andrew, cousin of Ricardo), José Antonio Páez, Jorge Alberto Páez, Eduardo Páez, Juan Manuel Páez, Octavio Páez, Daniel Páez (another relatives)
 Jaime Ponce, Andrés Ponce (brother)
 Antonio Ravelo,  (brother)
 Roberto Rosales, Aileen Rosales (sister), Harold Rosales (brother), Oriana Altuve (cousin)
 Manuel Sanhouse Sr., Manuel Sanhouse Jr. (son)
 Luis Manuel Seijas, Luis Roberto Seijas (brother)
 Argenis Tortolero, Edson Tortolero (son), Juan Arango (son-in-law)
 Vicente Vega, Renny Vega (son)
 Gerardo Vielma, Leonel Vielma (son), Ronaldo Rivas, Edson Rivas (grandsons/nephews of Leonel)

Vietnam
 Trần Đình Kha, Trần Đình Khương (brother)
 Quế Ngọc Mạnh, Quế Ngọc Hải (brother)
 Bùi Tiến Dũng, Bùi Tiến Dụng (brother)
 Văn Sỹ Chi (father), Văn Sỹ Sơn, Văn Sỹ Hùng, Văn Sỹ Thủy (brother)
 Jonny Trịnh, Thomas Trịnh (brother)

Zimbabwe

 Onai Chingawo, Russel Madamombe (husband)

See also
List of professional sports families

References

 
Families of note
Lists of sports families
Families of note
Association football families